Avallersuaq, old spelling Avatdlerssuaq, is an uninhabited island of the Cape Farewell Archipelago in Kujalleq municipality of southern Greenland.

It is a small and rocky island located east of Itilleq Island (Egger). The small Saningassoq group of five islets lies to the north.

See also
List of islands of Greenland

Bibliography

References

Uninhabited islands of Greenland
Kujalleq
Cape Farewell Archipelago